Eleven Men Out is comedy drama directed by Róbert Ingi Douglas. The film participated in the Toronto International Film Festival (2005), the Berlin International Film Festival (2006), and the Hawaii International Film Festival.

Plot summary 
Ottar Thor is the star player of the Icelandic football team KR (Reykjavík FC). He is a well-liked player who causes a stir when he admits being gay to his teammates and then goes on a journey to discover himself (with the help of the local press). He soon finds himself on the bench for most of his team's matches and decides to call it quits with KR. He joins a small amateur team mainly made up of men like himselfgay guys trying to play soccer in a straight world.

The director of KR, who happens to be Ottar Thor's father, tries everything in his power to persuade Ottar to come back and play for his team, but he needs to get himself back into the closet before playing pro football again. A struggle between father and son starts. Ottar Thor also has a son, a teenager who is not coping well with all the attention his father is getting for the wrong reasons.

Ottar Thor finally gives in to his father and returns to KR on the condition that KR plays one match against the gay team. His father accepts this condition, not realising that the match will take place on Gay Pride Day. KR wins the match 8–0.

Main cast
Björn Hlynur Haraldsson as Ottar Thor
Lilja Nótt Þórarinsdóttir as Gugga
Arnmundur Ernst as Magnus
Helgi Björnsson as Pétur
Þorsteinn Bachmann as Georg
Sigurður Skúlason as Eiríkur
Lilja Guðrún Þorvaldsdóttir as Ragnheiður
Jón Atli Jónasson as Orri
Björk Jakobsdóttir as Lára
Damon Younger as Brósi 
Erlendur Eiríksson as Alfreð 
Valdimar Örn Flygenring as Valdi 
Marius Sverrisson as Starri
Viðir Guðmundsson as Daníel
Magnús Jónsson as Aron
Davíð Guðbrandsson as Ingvar
Jóhann G. Jóhannsson as Matthias 
Árni Pétur Guðjónsson as Logi 
Jón Ingi Hákonarson as Straight Leikmadur 
Serouna Yansane as Percy
Jón Jósep Snæbjörnsson as Stebbi1 
Ísgerður Elfa Gunnarsdóttir as Sigurbjörg
Hilmár Jónsson as Viktor 
Stefán Jónsson as Ási Sálfræðingur 
Pétur Einarsson as Björgvin 
Elli Johannesson as Gunnar
Gudmundur Thorvaldsson as Markmadur (as Guðmundur Ingi Þorvaldsson) 
Ívar Örn Sverrisson as Liðsmaður KR1
Felix Bergsson as Dómari 
Ingibjörg Reynisdóttir as Blaðakona
Björn Ingi Hilmarsson as Logregulumadur
Thelma Bjork Jonsdottir as Logreglukona
Bergur Þór Ingólfsson as Lidsmadur SAA1, 
Arnar Björnsson as Actor
Róbert I. Douglas as Hommahatari I Utvarpi 
Gunnþór Sigurðsson as Actor
Erling Jóhannesson as Actor 
Nanna Ósk Jónsdóttir as Samsidanith (Sigga) 
Pattra Sriyanonge as Rosa - Goth Girl 
Ingvar Þórðarson as Homma hatari 
Þorsteinn Bachmann as Georg (uncredited)

Reception 
The film has been compared to the 2004 German production Guys and Balls.

Release
Eleven Men Out was released on 31 August 2005.

Awards
'''Edda Awards - Iceland 
 Nominated for an Edda Award for Best Film
 Nominated for an Edda Award for Supporting Actor or Supporting Actress of the Year - Þorsteinn Bachmann 
 Nominated for an Edda Award for Supporting Actor or Supporting Actress of the Year - Helgi Björnsson
 Nominated for an Edda Award''' for Supporting Actor or Supporting Actress of the Year - Jón Atli Jónason

References

External links 
 
Official U.S. Site

2005 films
Association football films
LGBT-related sports comedy-drama films
LGBT-related coming-of-age films
2000s Icelandic-language films
Icelandic LGBT-related films
Icelandic romance films
2000s sports comedy-drama films
2005 LGBT-related films
Gay-related films
Films directed by Róbert Ingi Douglas
Icelandic comedy-drama films
2005 comedy films
2005 drama films